Neoregelia hoehneana is a species of bromeliad in the genus Neoregelia. This species is endemic to Brazil.

Cultivars
 Neoregelia 'Antlers'
 Neoregelia 'Daddy Long Legs'
 Neoregelia 'Tiger Stripes'

References

BSI Cultivar Registry Retrieved 11 October 2009

hoehneana
Flora of Brazil